Gabber is a style of electronic dance music and a subgenre of hardcore techno, as well as the surrounding subculture. The music is more commonly referred to as Hardcore, which is characterised by fast beats, distorted & heavier kickdrums, with darker themes and samples.  This style was developed in Rotterdam and Amsterdam in the 1990s by producers like Marc Acardipane, Paul Elstak, DJ Rob, and The Prophet, forming record labels such as Rotterdam Records, Mokum Records, Pengo Records and Industrial Strength Records.

The word "gabber" comes from Amsterdam Bargoens slang and means "friend".

Gabber remains highly popular in the Netherlands, and has seen a major resurgence in recent years. Gabber formed as an underground, anti-establishment movement with small, underground raves, most often illegally held in empty warehouses, basements and tunnels. Rave parties such as Thunderdome, held by ID&T and Mysteryland, became hugely popular, eventually becoming part of mainstream Dutch culture in the 1990s. The music and culture quickly spread across Europe and the world, finding a home with the rave communities in countries such as the UK, Spain, Italy, USA, and Australia.

Origins

Gabber, also known as gabba, early hardcore or Rotterdam hardcore is a style of electronic music and a subgenre of hardcore techno. It was derived from acid house, techno and new beat in the early 1990s. The musical style is described as "a relentless mix of superfast BPMs, distorted kickdrums, and roared vocals". The music is generally between 140 up to 190 beats per minute with samples taken from films or other tracks.

The word "gabber" comes from an Amsterdam Bargoens slang, based on the Hebrew chaver meaning "mate" or "friend". An Amsterdam DJ was asked about the hard Rotterdam scene and said "They're just a bunch of gabbers having fun". Having heard this, Paul Elstak etched in the vinyl on the first Euromasters record (released through Rotterdam Records in 1992), "Gabber zijn is geen schande!" ("It's not a disgrace to be a gabber!"). The word gained popularity in the Rotterdam music scene and people started to call themselves "gabbers".

Music
Influential early labels were DJ Paul Elstak's Rotterdam Records, Mokum Records in Amsterdam, and Lenny Dee's New York based Industrial Strength Recordings. Alongside Elstak and Dee, other early artists included Marc Acardipane, The Prophet, and Rotterdam Termination Source.

Elstak and DJ Rob organised parties first at Parkzicht in Rotterdam and when the numbers attending increased they moved to the Energiehal. ID&T later organised Thunderdome parties for up to 40,000 people. When the sound spread to London in the mid-1990s, Dead by Dawn parties at the 121 Centre in Brixton played gabba, speedcore, and noise. In the Midwestern United States, gabber inspired the foundation of the label Drop Bass Network.

Subculture

The popularity of gabber created a youth subculture in the Netherlands. Fashion-wise, gabber ravers wore tracksuits, bomber jackets, and Nike Air Max shoes. Tennis tracksuits from the Italian fashion label L’Alpina were prized. Most men shaved their heads bald, while women braided their hair and shaved the sides. Drug use was common, with ecstasy and speed the popular choice.

Later the look became blouses and short skirts for women. Men wore polo shirts and shirts with jeans and army boots, with a racist minority wearing the Lonsdale brand because of its connection to right-wing extremism. Gabber also had a small following in the German neo-Nazi fringe movement. In order to repudiate the connection, labels and artists began to release anti-fascist and anti-racist statements. Some examples includes "Chosen Anthem (Against Racism)" by DJ Chosen Few, "Die Nazi Scum" by Party Animals featuring MC Rob Gee, "Time to Make a Stand" by United Hardcore and "Fuck the Nazism" by Hellcore. Mokum Records made its slogan (printed on all records): "Hardcore united against fascism and racism". Some producers are themselves black, such as Dark Raver and Loftgroover. When gabber became popular again in the 2000s, Dutch neo-Nazis attempted to capitalise on it, but their attempts were short-lived.

By the mid-1990s, gabber had become part of mainstream culture in the Netherlands. Billboard magazine called it the country's "first homegrown youth culture" in 1997. Its popularity also led to parody tracks, such as Gabber Piet's "Hakke & Zage", which drew on the theme tune of the Peppi & Kokki
children's television show. The name also referred to hakken, the style of gabber dancing characterised by fast leg movements which had become popular. Gabber fans were angered by the commercialisation of their scene, and Gabber Piet was fired from his job at ID&T. His album Love U Hardcore attempted to make amends but it did not sell well.

25 Years of Hardcore
While the peak of gabber popularity waned in the years after the millennium, there always remained a die-hard few that kept the sound and culture alive. In 2017, Thunderdome celebrated 25 years of hardcore at the Jaarbeurs congress centre in Utrecht. It was attended by 40,000 ravers  and was heralded as the official comeback for Thunderdome. The event was the ultimate encapsulation of the history of hardcore, featuring the biggest names in hardcore , showcasing evolution of hardcore music over 25 years from all of the leading hardcore DJs and producers from then and now.

See also
 List of gabber artists

Notes

External links

20th-century music genres
Hardcore music genres
Dutch styles of music
Dutch youth culture
Dutch words and phrases
1990s neologisms